Alexander Johansson (born 30 October 1995) is a Swedish football forward who plays for Varbergs BoIS.

References

1995 births
Living people
Swedish footballers
Association football forwards
Vinbergs IF players
Tvååkers IF players
Varbergs BoIS players
Sandnes Ulf players
Ettan Fotboll players
Allsvenskan players
Norwegian First Division players
Swedish expatriate footballers
Expatriate footballers in Norway
Swedish expatriate sportspeople in Norway